
Marri may refer to

Species
Corymbia calophylla, marri,  common name of a tree (syn. Eucalyptus calophylla)
Pterocaesio marri, a ray-finned fish

Places

Pakistan
Marri (Rajanpur), a village in Punjab, Pakistan
Marri-Bugti Country, a tribal region during the British occupation of Baluchistan
Gul Beg Marri railway station 
Jalal Marri railway station

Elsewhere
Marri, Iran (disambiguation), several villages 
Marri, Tibet, a village

Other
Marri (name)
Marri (tribe) in Balochistan
Marri Ngarr, an indigenous Australian people of the Northern Territory
Anglo-Marri wars  in the 19th and 20th centuries
Al-Marri v. Spagone, a 2009 American court case

See also
Marris, a surname